The champions and runners-up of the All England Open Badminton Championships Ladies' Doubles tournament, first introduced to the championship in 1899. From 1915 to 1919, and from 1940 to 1946, no competition was held due to the two World Wars.

History
In the Amateur era, Meriel Lucas (1899-1900, 1902, 1904-1910) holds the record for the most titles in the Ladies' Doubles, winning All England ten times. Lucas also holds the record for most consecutive titles with seven from 1904 to 1910.

Since the Open era of badminton began in late 1979 with the inclusion of professional badminton players from around the world in 1980, Gao Ling and Huang Sui (2001-2006) holds the record for most and also consecutive victories with six.

Gillian Perrin, Nora Gardner, Atsuko Tokuda, Yoshiko Yonekura and Verawaty Fadjrin are the only players in history to reach the All England Open Badminton Ladies' Doubles Final in both the Amateur and Open Era. Perrin managed to do so a total of seven times, winning twice in the Amateur Era and once in the Open Era, Gardner four, winning twice in the Open Era, Tokuda thrice, with a sole victory in the Amateur Era and both Yonekura and Fadjrin twice, with Fadjrin registering a victory in the Amateur Era.

Finalists

Amateur era

Open era

Statistics

Multiple titles
Bold indicates active players.

Champions by country

Multiple finalists
Bold indicates active players.Italic indicates players who never won the championship.

Notes

See also
 List of All England men's singles champions
 List of All England women's singles champions
 List of All England men's doubles champions
 List of All England mixed doubles champions

References

External links
All England Champions 1899-2007
BadmintonEngland.co.uk
badmintoneurope.com
Pat Davis: The Encyclopaedia of Badminton. Robert Hale, London, 1987, 

All England Open Badminton Championships
Lists of sportswomen